Chehreh is a village and commercial hub in Babol Kenar Rural District, Babol Kenar District, Babol County, Mazandaran Province, Iran. At the 2006 census, its population was 744, in 203 families.

References 

Populated places in Babol County